Dante's Mysteries (Swedish: Dantes mysterier) is a 1931 Swedish drama film directed by Paul Merzbach and starring Dante, Elisabeth Frisk and Zarah Leander. It was shot at the Råsunda Studios in Stockholm. The film's sets were designed by the art director Arne Åkermark. It marked the film debut of Leander who went on to be a star of German cinema.

Synopsis
The plot revolves around a famous conjurer who performs his most famous tricks at a fashionable hotel.

Cast
 Dante as 	Self
 Elisabeth Frisk as Dante's Wife / Young Chinese Girl
 Zarah Leander as 	Grand Café Guest / Singing Demon
 Eric Abrahamsson as First crook
 Gustaf Lövås as Second crook
 Eric Gustafson as 	Café Grand Maître d'
 Charlie Almlöf as Journalist
 Georg Fernqvist as 	Journalist
 Alexander Field as 	Crook
 Paul Hagman as Journalist
 Frithiof Hedvall as	Grand Café Guest
 Sune Holmqvist as 	Bellboy
 Helge Kihlberg as 	Grand Café Guest
 Eva Leckström as 	Dancing Girl With Matches
 Gunhild Sundelies as Grand Café Guest
 Ulla Söderbaum as Dancing Girl With Matches

References

Bibliography 
 Bock, Hans-Michael and Bergfelder, Tim. The Concise Cinegraph: An Encyclopedia of German Cinema. Berghahn Books, 2009.

External links 
 

1931 films
Swedish drama films
1931 drama films
1930s Swedish-language films
Films directed by Paul Merzbach
Swedish black-and-white films
Films set in Stockholm
1930s Swedish films